In 1987 Turkey received its first F-16 Fighting Falcon under the 'Peace Onyx-1' deal, further examples have been locally produced through Turkish Aerospace Industries. Other modern platforms that have entered service is the Boeing 737 Peace Eagle for Airborne early warning and control, the Airbus A400M Atlas for  strategic airlift, the KC-135 Stratotanker for aerial refueling, and a host of other helicopters and trainers. Turkey placed an order for 30 F-35 Lightning II's with four delivered to Luke Air Force Base, and then had the order cancelled due to the country's acquisition of the S-400 SAM systems from Russia. This program was replaced by the Turkish 5th generation fighter TAI TF-X. Below is a list of current aircraft in the Turkish Air Force.

Aircraft

Current inventory

See also
   
 Modern equipment of the Turkish Land Forces
 Equipment of the Turkish Navy
 Equipment of the Turkish Gendarmerie
 Equipment of the Turkish Coast Guard

References

External links
Official Turkish Air Force Website

Turkish Air Force
Turkish military aircraft
Turkish military-related lists